Pak Song-il is the ambassador for American affairs at North Korea's delegation to the United Nations.

References 

North Korean diplomats
Living people
Year of birth missing (living people)